El Roi is one of the names of God in the Hebrew Bible. It is used in Genesis 16:13 by Hagar.

Solomon b. Isaac translates it "god of sight", Joseph b. Isaac Bekhor Shor translates it "god saw me", Abraham Ibn Ezra, Bahya b. Asher, and Obadiah b. Jacob Sforno, "god who appears", David Kimhi, "god I saw" or "visible god", and Levi b. Gershon as "all-seeing god".

References

Book of Genesis
Deities in the Hebrew Bible
Names of God in Christianity
Names of God in Judaism
Hagar
El (deity)